Murmansk is a port city and the administrative center of Murmansk Oblast in the far northwest part of Russia. It sits on both slopes and banks of a modest ria or fjord, Kola Bay, an estuarine inlet of the Barents Sea. Its bulk is on the east bank of the inlet. It is in the north of the rounded Kola Peninsula which covers most of the oblast.

Benefiting from the North Atlantic Current, Murmansk resembles cities of its size across western Russia, with highway and railway access to the rest of Europe, and the northernmost trolleybus system on Earth. It lies over 2° north of the Arctic Circle.  Its connectivity contrasts to the isolation of Arctic ports like the Siberian Dikson on the shores of the Kara Sea, and Iqaluit, in the Canadian Arctic. Despite long, snowy winters, Murmansk's climate is moderated by the generally ice-free waters around it.

It remains the largest city north of the Arctic Circle, with over 100,000 more inhabitants than Norilsk, Russia, and is a major port of the Arctic Ocean.

Etymology
The name of the city is derived from Murman, from an old name for Norwegians by Russians, likely a borrowing from Old Norse norðmaðr, which gave its name to the Murman Coast and the surrounding region including the Kola Peninsula.

History

Murmansk was the last city founded in the Russian Empire. In 1915, World War I needs led to the construction of the railroad from Petrozavodsk to an ice-free location on the Murman Coast in the Russian Arctic, to which Russia's allies shipped military supplies. The terminus became known as the Murman station and soon boasted a port, a naval base, and an adjacent settlement with a population that quickly grew in size and soon surpassed the nearby towns of Alexandrovsk and Kola.

On , 1916, Russian Transport Minister Alexander Trepov petitioned to grant urban status to the railway settlement. On , 1916, the petition was approved and the town was named Romanov-on-Murman (Romanov-na-Murmane), after the Imperial Russian dynasty of Romanovs. On , 1916, the official ceremony was performed, and the date is now considered the official date of the city's foundation.

In the winter of 1917 the British North Russia Squadron under Rear Admiral Thomas Kemp was established at Murmansk.

From 1918 to 1920, during the Russian Civil War, the town was occupied by the Western powers, who had been allied in World War I, and also controlled by the White Army forces.

On February 13, 1926, local self-government was organized in Murmansk for the first time, during a plenary session of the Murmansk City Soviet, which elected a Presidium. Before this, the city was governed by the authorities of Alexandrovsky Uyezd and later of Murmansk Governorate. On August 1, 1927, the All-Russian Central Executive Committee (VTsIK) issued two resolutions: "On the Establishment of Leningrad Oblast" and "On the Borders and Composition of the Okrugs of Leningrad Oblast", which transformed Murmansk Governorate into Murmansk Okrug within Leningrad Oblast and made Murmansk the administrative center of Murmansk Okrug.

In 1934, the Murmansk Okrug Executive Committee developed a redistricting proposal, which included a plan to enlarge the city by merging the surrounding territories in the north, south, and west into Murmansk. While this plan was not confirmed by the Leningrad Oblast Executive Committee, in 1935–1937 several rural localities of Kolsky and Polyarny Districts were merged into Murmansk anyway.

According to the Presidium of the Leningrad Oblast Executive Committee resolution of February 26, 1935, the administrative center of Polyarny District was moved from Polyarnoye to Sayda-Guba. However, the provisions of the resolution were not fully implemented, and due to military construction in Polyarnoye, the administrative center was instead moved to Murmansk in the beginning of 1935. In addition to being the administrative center of Murmansk Okrug, Murmansk continued to serve as the administrative center of Polyarny District until September 11, 1938. On February 10, 1938, when the VTsIK adopted a Resolution changing the administrative-territorial structure of Murmansk Okrug, the city of Murmansk became a separate administrative division of the okrug, equal in status to that of the districts. This status was retained when Murmansk Okrug was transformed into Murmansk Oblast on May 28, 1938. The Germans were promised the use of the port, they called Norwegenhafen for transportation of goods and raw materials from 1922 to 1941.

During World War II, Murmansk was a link to the Western world for the Soviet Union with large quantities of goods important to the respective military efforts traded with the Allies: primarily seeing military equipment, manufactured goods and raw materials brought into the Soviet Union. The supplies were brought to the city in the Arctic convoys.

German forces in Finnish territory launched an offensive against the city in 1941 as part of Operation Silver Fox. Murmansk suffered extensive destruction, the magnitude of which was rivaled only by the destruction of Leningrad and Stalingrad. However, fierce Soviet resistance and harsh local weather conditions with the bad terrain prevented the Germans from capturing the city and cutting off the vital Karelian railway line and the ice-free harbor.

The Luftwaffe bombed the city 792 times during World War II.

For the rest of the war, Murmansk served as a transit point for weapons and other supplies entering the Soviet Union from other Allied nations. This resistance was commemorated at the 40th anniversary of the victory over the Germans in the formal designation of Murmansk as a Hero City on May 6, 1985. During the Cold War Murmansk was a center of Soviet submarine and icebreaker activity. After the dissolution of the Soviet Union, the nearby city and naval base of Severomorsk remains the headquarters of the Russian Northern Fleet.

The Hotel Arctic opened in 1984 becoming the tallest building above the Arctic Circle.

On January 1, 2015, the territory of Murmansk was expanded when the urban-type settlement of Roslyakovo, previously under the jurisdiction of the closed administrative-territorial formation of Severomorsk, was abolished and its territory merged into Murmansk.

Administrative and municipal status
Within the framework of administrative divisions, it is incorporated as the City of Murmansk—an administrative unit with the status equal to that of the districts. As a municipal division, the City of Murmansk is incorporated as Murmansk Urban Okrug.

City divisions

, the city is divided into three administrative okrugs:
Leninsky (Ленинский(Lenin) )
Oktyabrsky (Октябрьский (October))
Pervomaysky (Первомайский (First May) )

City districts were established in Murmansk for the first time by the Decree of the Presidium of the Supreme Soviet of the Russian SFSR of April 20, 1939; at the time, three city districts (Kirovsky, Leninsky, and Mikoyanovsky) were created. They were abolished on June 2, 1948. The same city districts were created for the second time on June 23, 1951.

Mikoyanovsky City District was renamed Oktyabrsky on October 30, 1957, but on September 30, 1958, all three city districts were again abolished. On June 10, 1967, two city districts were created (Leninsky and Oktyabrsky); Pervomaysky City District was split from Oktyabrsky on February 21, 1975. In the Charter of the Hero City of Murmansk, adopted on December 17, 1995, the districts started to be referred to as administrative okrugs.

Demographics

The population of the city, according to the 2010 Census, was 307,257, of these, 141,130 men (45.9%) and 166,127 women (54.1%), down from 468,039 recorded in the 1989 Census. Ethnic Russians make up the majority of the population, but Ukrainian and Belarusian minorities also live in the city.

Ethnic composition (2010):
 Russians – 89.6%
 Ukrainians – 4.6%
 Belarusians – 1.6%
 Tatars – 0.8%
 Azerbaijanis – 0.7%
 Others – 2.6%

Politics
In November 2010 direct mayoral elections were abolished; they were reinstituted in January 2014, with the most recent elections for mayor and city council taking place in September 2014.

Museums and monuments 
Murmansk has two main museums: Murmansk Oblast Museum and Murmansk Oblast Art Museum; there are also several small museums. There are three professional theaters, libraries, and an aquarium in Murmansk.
Murmansk is the venue of the decommissioned Lenin which is now a museum ship.
Alyosha Monument, Murmansk or Defenders of the Soviet Arctic during the Great Patriotic War monument is also located in Murmansk. The main square of Murmansk is Five Corners, Murmansk.

Culture 
There are three professional theaters in Murmansk. The oldest is the Murmansk Puppetry, opened in 1933. The largest in the city was the Murmansk Regional Drama Theater, opened in 1939 . the Drama Theater of the Northern Fleet was opened in 1946.

Sports
The city's association football team, FC Sever Murmansk, played in the Russian Second Division until 2014 when it folded due to financial difficulties.

Bandy club Murman has played in the Russian Bandy Super League, last in 2011–2012. Between 2012 and 2018 they were playing in the second tier Russian Bandy Supreme League, but will from the 2018–19 season be a Super League team again. Their home arena, Stadium Stroitel, has an audience capacity of 5,000.

The city is one of only three places with representation in the female league, through the team Arktika. The former has been awarded every years since the inaugural tournament in 1934. Norway, Finland, Sweden, Ukraine, Belarus and the Baltic countries take part in the North Festival Polar Olympiad.

Religion
To commemorate the 85th anniversary of the city's foundation, the snow-white church of the Savior-on-the-Waters was modeled after the White Monuments of Vladimir and Suzdal and built on the shore for the sailors of Murmansk.

15 religious associations have been registered in Murmansk. The largest is the Russian Orthodox Church, Murmansk is the center of its Murmansk and Monchegorsk diocese, as well as the Murmansk Metropolis. The city has about a dozen Orthodox churches, the department of the head of the diocese and the metropolis of Metropolitan Simon is located in St. Nicholas Cathedral.

Economy

Media
Murmansk's evening newspaper is Vecherniy Murmansk, published since 1991.

Transportation
The port of Murmansk remains ice-free year round due to the warm North Atlantic Current and is an important fishing and shipping destination. It is home port to Atomflot, the world's only fleet of nuclear-powered icebreakers.

The Port of Murmansk is the headquarters of Sevmorput (Northern Sea Route) and the administration of Russian Arctic maritime transport. In 2018, the Russian government transferred the main responsibility for the Northern Sea Route to Rosatom which through its ROSATOMFLOT subsidiary manages the Russian nuclear powered icebreaker fleet based in Murmansk.

Murmansk is linked by the Kirov Railway to St. Petersburg and is linked to the rest of Russia by the M18 Kola Motorway. Murmansk Airport provides air links to Moscow and St. Petersburg, as well as an international connection to Tromsø, Norway.

Buses and trolleybuses provide local transport.

Arctic Bridge
Murmansk is set to be the Russian terminus of the Arctic Bridge, a sea route linking it to the Canadian port of Churchill, Manitoba. Even though the passage has not been fully tested for commercial shipping yet, Russian interest in this project (along with the Northwest Passage) is substantial, as the bridge will serve as a major trade route between North America, Europe and Asia.

Education
 
Murmansk is home to Murmansk State Technical University, the Murmansk Arctic State University (formerly Murmansk State Pedagogical University), the Murmansk Institute of Humanities and the Murmansk College of Arts (the only Art School of the Kola Peninsula, formerly the 'Murmansk Music School'). The city has 86 primary schools and 56 secondary schools, two boarding schools, and three reform schools.
There is also a branch of the Naval Academy in Murmansk, where cadets study, who in the future should become officers of the Russian Navy.

Twin towns – sister cities

Murmansk is twinned with:

 Luleå, Sweden (1972)
 Vadsø, Norway (1973)
 Jacksonville, United States (1975)
 Groningen, Netherlands (1989)
 Alanya, Turkey (2014)
 Minsk, Belarus (2014)
 Harbin, China (2016)

Former Twin towns – sister cities
  Szczecin (1993-2022) Cancelled as a result of the 2022 Russian invasion of Ukraine
  Rovaniemi (1962-2022) Cancelled as a result of Russian invasion of Ukraine.
  Tromsø (1972-2022) Cancelled because of concerns related to the 2022 Russian invasion of Ukraine
  Akureyri, Iceland (1994-2022) Cancelled as a result of the 2022 Russian invasion of Ukraine

Notable people
Nikita Alexeev, ice hockey player
Vitaliy Nikolayevich Bubentsov, Russian artist
Aleksey Goman, pop singer
Kate Grigorieva, supermodel
Valentina Gunina, chess grandmaster
Halyna Hutchins, cinematographer and journalist
Vladimir Konstantinov, ice hockey player
Irina Kovalenko, supermodel and Miss Russia winner
Larisa Kruglova, sprinter
Sergey Kuryokhin, actor and musician
Irina Malgina, biathlete
Elizaveta Nazarenkova, Uzbek rhythmic gymnast
Yevgeny Nikitin, opera singer
Zlata Ognevich, Ukrainian singer
Sergei Rozhkov, biathlete
Alexei Semenov, ice hockey player
Sergey Subbotin, former mayor
Konstantin Volkov, ice hockey player
Vitaly Zdorovetskiy, YouTube personality, prankster
Yana Kunitskaya, UFC bantamweight fighter

Geography

Climate
Murmansk features a subarctic climate (Köppen Dfc), with long and cold winters and short, cool summers. In the city, freezing temperatures are routinely experienced from October to May. Average temperatures exceed 0 degrees Celsius only from May through October. However, temperatures routinely plunge below  during the winter.

Murmansk's brief summer is mild, with average highs in July exceeding . The city is slightly wetter during the summer than the winter and receives an annual average of just under  of precipitation.

The "midnight sun" is above the horizon from 22 May to 23 July (63 days), and the period with continuous darkness lasts a bit shorter, polar night from 2 December to 10 January (40 days).

Murmansk has been affected by global warming in recent decades, similar to other Arctic locations. Summer has also been affected, with a  average high for June 2013, and a  average high during July 2018.

References

Notes

Sources

External links

Official website of Murmansk 
News of Murmansk
Interactive map of Murmansk 
Barentsnova.com, Murmansk business news, statistics
Atomic ice breaker fleet
Murmansk's gorgeous garages — a photo journal by BBC news journalist Jorn Madslien
Views of Murmansk group on Flickr
Video overview of Murmansk in English, 4½ minutes, 2009
Murmansk State Technical University
British North Russian Expeditionary Force 1918–1919 (based at Murmansk)
"Big-dollar deals tempt Arctic firms" BBC article on the energy industry's effect on Murmansk

 
Populated places of Arctic Russia
Barents Sea
Cities and towns in Murmansk Oblast
Populated coastal places in Russia
Russian and Soviet Navy bases
Port cities and towns in Russia
1916 establishments in the Russian Empire
Populated places established in 1916
Kolsky Uyezd